Ruellia verbasciformis (syn. Eurychanes verbasciformis (Nees) Lindau) is a plant native to the Cerrado vegetation of Brazil. This plant is cited in Flora Brasiliensis by Carl Friedrich Philipp von Martius.

References

External links
 Flora Brasiliensis: Eurychanes verbasciformis
 Flora vascular do bioma Cerrado

verbasciformis
Flora of Brazil